Beregovoy is a rural locality (a settlement) in Verkh-Suyetsky Selsoviet, Suyetsky District, Altai Krai, Russia. The population was 49 as of 2013. There are 3 streets.

Geography 
Beregovoy is located 5 km southwest of Verkh-Suyetka (the district's administrative centre) by road. Osinovsky is the nearest rural locality.

References 

Rural localities in Suyetsky District